The National Motor Freight Traffic Association (NMFTA) is a nonprofit membership organization headquartered in Alexandria, Virginia, United States. Its members are motor carriers operating in interstate, intrastate and foreign commerce. The association was established in 1956. 

NMFTA's mission is to "promote, advance and improve the welfare and interests of the motor carrier industry and the motor carriers operating in commerce, both domestically and/or internationally." 

The NMFTA publishes the National Motor Freight Classification® (NMFC®), a standard that classifies cargo. NMFTA also produces ClassIT®, the online version of the NMFC. The Commodity Classification Standards Board (CCSB) develops and maintains the NMFC.

The NMFTA assigns and publishes the Standard Carrier Alpha Code (SCAC), a two- to four-letter code used to identify road transport companies. The NMFTA also assigns and publishes the Standard Point Location Code (SPLC), a numeric code to identify locations in North America that originate and receive cargo.

See also
Less than truckload shipping
National Motor Freight Classification
Commodity Classification Standards Board
Standard Carrier Alpha Code
Standard Point Location Code

External links
NMFTA Website

References

Transportation associations in the United States
Trade associations based in the United States
Organizations based in Alexandria, Virginia

Organizations established in 1956
Freight transport